Henry Francis Conyngham, Earl of Mount Charles (6 April 1795 – 26 December 1824), was an Irish Tory politician.

Conyngham was born to Henry Conyngham, 1st Marquess Conyngham, and his wife Elizabeth Denison. He was educated in 1813 at Trinity College, Cambridge. He was a Tory Member of Parliament (MP) for Donegal from 1818 until his death at the age of 29 in Nice, France. He died unmarried and with no issue, and was buried in Nice.

References

thePeerage

External links 

1795 births
1824 deaths
Courtesy earls
Heirs apparent who never acceded
Members of the Parliament of the United Kingdom for County Donegal constituencies (1801–1922)
UK MPs 1818–1820
UK MPs 1820–1826
Irish Conservative Party MPs
Henry
Alumni of Trinity College, Cambridge